Dayton Fire Station No. 14 is an historic structure at 1422 N. Main St. in Dayton, Ohio. It was added to the National Register of Historic Places on September 27, 1980. It was designed by the Peters, Burns & Pretzinger firm.

Historic uses 
Fire station number 14 was built 1901 and is an example of mission style architecture. House number 14 was the last fire house in Dayton to use horse drawn equipment which ceased in 1917.

See also
 Dayton Fire Department Station No. 16
 List of Registered Historic Places in Montgomery County, Ohio

References

National Register of Historic Places in Montgomery County, Ohio
Fire stations completed in 1911
Fire stations on the National Register of Historic Places in Ohio
Buildings and structures in Dayton, Ohio
Defunct fire stations in Ohio
1911 establishments in Ohio
Mission Revival architecture in Ohio